Wonastow is a village in Monmouthshire, south east Wales.

History and amenities 

Wonastow has a twelfth-century church dedicated to St. Wonnow or Saint Winwaloe, believed to have been built on a seventh-century religious site.

Monmouth's Wonastow Road industrial estate adjoins the road between Wonastow and Monmouth. In the 16th century the Harberte family held Wonastow Court, amongst them several High Sheriffs of Monmouthshire. In the 17th century the prominent Milbourne family had their seat here, amongst them men such as Henry Milbourne who was one of the most important magistrates of northern Monmouthshire of his time and his nephew, William Milborne (1633-1660), an MP.

References

External links 
 

Villages in Monmouthshire